Budgewoi Peninsula is a coastal suburb of the Central Coast region of New South Wales, Australia, on a narrow peninsula between Munmorah Lake and the Pacific Ocean. It is part of the  local government area.

Budgewoi Peninsula is unpopulated, with nearly all of its land area being part of the Munmorah State Conservation Area.

Suburbs of the Central Coast (New South Wales)